Lau Wai Cheng (born 3 June 1967) is a Malaysian table tennis player. She competed in the women's singles event at the 1988 Summer Olympics.

References

1967 births
Living people
Malaysian female table tennis players
Olympic table tennis players of Malaysia
Table tennis players at the 1988 Summer Olympics
Place of birth missing (living people)
Southeast Asian Games medalists in table tennis